Mikkel Lund (born 8 January 1979) is a Danish orienteering competitor.

He won a bronze medal with the Danish relay team at the 2002 European Orienteering Championships. At the 2006 World Orienteering Championships he placed 8th in the relay with the Danish team. Lund lives in Oslo and represents the club Bækkelagets SK, where he also works as a coach.

References

External links
 
 Mikkel Lund at World of O Runners

1979 births
Living people
Danish orienteers
Male orienteers
Foot orienteers
Orienteering coaches
Danish expatriate sportspeople in Norway
Competitors at the 2009 World Games